Harvinder Singh Phoolka, is a senior advocate of Delhi High Court, politician, human rights activist, and author. He served as the Leader of the Opposition in the Punjab Legislative Assembly.

He is known for spearheading what is described as "one of the longest and most torturous  legal battle" and "crusades" to gain justice for the victims of 1984 anti-Sikh pogroms and fighting individual cases on the involvement of Congress-I leaders H. K. L. Bhagat, Sajjan Kumar and Jagdish Tytler despite the government cover-up. He received threatening letters for unearthing involvements of ruling political party leaders in what the Asian Age called "the Mother of all Cover-ups" in a front-page story. The special anniversary edition of the Outlook included Phoolka in its list of 50 people that make a difference in India, alongside Amartya Sen and Abhinav Ghosh. He unsuccessfully contested 2014 Lok Sabha Polls as an AAP Candidate from Ludhiana . In 2017 he successfully contested from Dakha Assembly constituency, but resigned on 12 October 2018 over alleged failure of Congress government in acting on Ranjit Singh commission's inquiry report on desecration of Guru Granth Sahib Ji. However his resignation was accepted by speaker after nearly 10 months on 9 August 2019.

Early life and education
Phoolka's formative years were spent at his native village Bhadaur, into Sidhu Jat royal family in the Barnala district of Punjab, India.
His education began in a small school in his village. He graduated from Ludhiana, and went to Law School in Chandigarh.

Family 
Phoolka married Maninder Kaur in 1983. She is a food technologist and was a 1990 "outstanding graduate" of American Institute of Baking, Kansas. She is said to have declined job offers in the United States and returned to India to support her husband's struggle for justice.

Career 
After completing his law degree in Chandigarh, Phoolka landed in Delhi to practice law. He served as member-secretary of the Justice Narula Committee formed in 1993 to probe the carnage. He was later appointed the counsel for Central Government in January 2001. He is known as a lawyer who won't take up a case if he finds that the client is in the wrong.

In 2014 he joined Aam Aadmi Party. In 2017 he won from Dakha Assembly constituency following which he was appointed the Leader of Opposition to Punjab Legislative Assembly. This appointment brought problems in his legal career, the Delhi Bar Council disallowed him from continuing his legal practice citing his acquiring an office of profit as the Leader of Opposition, hence, in July 2017, he resigned as the Leader of Opposition to fight the 1984-Sikh-riot case in the Delhi High Court. In January 2019, he left AAP stating that he wanted to dedicate his life to starting a movement against the atrocities committed during the 1984-Sikh-Riots.

1984 Anti-Sikh riots 
Phoolka is well known for spearheading the crusade to seek justice in the 1984 anti-Sikh genocide in New Delhi that followed the assassination of Indira Gandhi and resulted in the killing of approximately 2,733 Sikhs and displacement of over 50,000 Sikhs within 2 days.
He was then just 28 years old and new to practising law and the city of Delhi.
He has put the cause of justice for 1984 Sikh massacre victims before his career and family life.

First encounter and escaping the massacre 
Phoolka was caught in the massacre while driving pregnant wife Maninder Kaur home on his motorbike.
When informed by a friend of the attacks on Sikhs, he avoided the main roads to reach his home in South Delhi via the slums of Kotla Mubarakpur.
Phoolka's Hindu landlord drove the mob away by telling them that the Phoolka family had left Delhi and hid them in his store room.  There the Phoolkas spent 2 days, and came out  under escort.  They then flew to Chandigarh in the cockpit of an overcrowded plane.

Resolution to fight 
Phoolka planned to move his residence to Chandigarh after the riots, but he learned that lawyers were needed to draft affidavits on behalf of the victims, and went to the Farsh Vihar relief camp to help.
The sight of orphans, bereaved mothers and wives in the relief camp prompted the Phoolkas to change their plans.  Instead of relocating to Chandigarh, they chose to stay and help the victims of the massacre.
Since then, Phoolka has fought cases relentlessly for the victims despite alleged government cover-up.

Formation of Citizens Justice Committee 
Phoolka conceived and pursued the formation of the Citizen's Justice Committee (CJC). The CJC served as an umbrella organisation for several human rights activists and legal luminaries.
Floated in May 1985, the CJC has been pivotal in representing the 1984 anti-Sikh massacre victims before the various judicial commissions that have been formed for inquiry into the massacres.
Membership included Justice Ranjit Singh Narula, Soli Sorabjee, General Jagjit Singh Aurora, Justice V. M. Tarkunde and Khushwant Singh.
As a counselor for the CJC, Phoolka represented the victims before the first formal sitting of the Mishra Commission on 29 July 1985.
The proceedings of the sitting were not made public and were closed to the press.
In March 1986, the CJC withdrew its co-operation from the Mishra Commission because it disagreed with the commission's decision to hold secret proceedings, and started filing individual court cases.

Mooting of Carnage84 website 
To make the many documents and findings of Citizens Justice Committee on 1984 Sikh massacre available to the general public, Phoolka mooted the idea of the "Carnage84.com" website, which was launched 10 July 2001 and claimed 150,000 visits from people of 30 different countries within only 10 days of it going online.

Blog on 1984 trials and related issues.
Mr. Phoolka has recently started to write a blog on matters relating to the 1984 riots. His blog can be accessed at www.phoolka.org and at phoolka.wordpress.com
Mr. Phoolka has also decided to tweet on issues relating to 1984 riots. His Twitter address is www.twitter.com/hsphoolka

Political career
Phoolka joined the Aam Aadmi Party in January 2014. In the Lok Sabha election of 2014, he contested well from Ludhiana in Punjab on the Aam Admi Party (AAP) ticket but he lost to the Congress candidate Ravneet Singh Bittu by 19,709 votes.

Notable quotes

Book 

Phoolka, along with human rights activist and journalist Manoj Mitta, has written the first account of the 1984 Anti-Sikh massacre in the form of a book titled When a Tree Shook Delhi.

References

External links
 Carnage84, showing evidence against various individuals
H.S.Phoolka and Jagdish Tytler Interview on NDTV
When a Tree Shook Delhi Book Conference 1

1984 anti-Sikh riots
Indian human rights activists
20th-century Indian lawyers
Living people
Politicians from Barnala district
Punjab, India MLAs 2012–2017
Aam Aadmi Party candidates in the 2014 Indian general election
Aam Aadmi Party politicians from Punjab, India
1955 births
Leaders of the Opposition in Punjab, India
Punjab, India MLAs 2017–2022